Michael Merecki (September 30, 1878 – 1958) was an American composer. His work was part of the music event in the art competition at the 1932 Summer Olympics.

References

1878 births
1958 deaths
American male composers
Olympic competitors in art competitions
People from Detroit